Callum Dixon is an English actor.

Career

Theatre
Dixon's work in theatre includes: Market Boy, Sing Yer Heart Out for the Lads, Rosencrantz & Guildenstern Are Dead, The Wind in the Willows, The Day I Stood Still, Somewhere, The Recruiting Officer and The Hour We Knew Nothing Of Each Other at the National Theatre, London; The Bright and Bold Design, Richard II, Edward II and Two Shakespearean Actors for the RSC; Mr Kolpert, A Real Classy Affair, Faith and Mojo at the Royal Court, London; Waiting At The Water's Edge at the Bush, London; All I Want is an Ugly Sister at the Lilian Baylis Theatre, London; When We Are Rich at the Nuffield Theatre, Southampton; Deadwood at the Watermill Theatre, Newbury; The Accrington Pals and Mowgli's Jungle at the Octagon Theatre, Bolton; Drummers for Out of Joint and Telstar in the West End, London. and, most recently, The Government Inspector at The Young Vic with Julian Barratt.

Television
His television credits include: The Armando Iannucci Shows, Ashes to Ashes, Hustle, Casualty, EastEnders, Hetty Wainthropp Investigates, The Bill, The Knock,  The Queen's Nose, Father Brown and Doctor Who.

Film
In film, he has appeared in Nick Moran's and James Hicks' Telstar (as actor-singer John Leyton), Babyjuice Express and Waterland.

Radio
Dixon's radio appearances include: Magpie Stories, Trampoline and The Wolfgang Chase.

References

External links
 

English male stage actors
Living people
English male television actors
Year of birth missing (living people)
Place of birth missing (living people)